WTDK (107.1 FM, "The Duck") is a radio station licensed to serve Federalsburg, Maryland.  The station is owned by the Draper Holdings Business Trust, as part of a cluster with CBS/Fox affiliate WBOC-TV (channel 16), NBC affiliate WRDE-LD (channel 31), Telemundo affiliate WBOC-LD (channel 42), and sister radio stations WCEM-FM, WBOC-FM, WCEM WAAI and WRDE-FM. It airs a classic hits music format.

The station was assigned the WTDK call letters by the Federal Communications Commission on July 31, 1995.

References

External links

TDK
Classic hits radio stations in the United States
Caroline County, Maryland